is a former Japanese footballer who last played for Thespakusatsu Gunma.

National team career
In July 2007, Hirashige was elected Japan U-20 national team for 2007 U-20 World Cup. At this tournament, he played 1 match against Nigeria.

Club statistics
Updated to 23 February 2019.

References

External links

Profile at Roasso Kumamoto
Profile at Thespakusatsu Gunma

1988 births
Living people
Association football people from Hiroshima Prefecture
Japanese footballers
Japan youth international footballers
J1 League players
J2 League players
Sanfrecce Hiroshima players
Tokushima Vortis players
Tokyo Verdy players
Thespakusatsu Gunma players
Roasso Kumamoto players
Association football forwards